Headlines and Deadlines: The Hits of A-ha is a greatest hits album by Norwegian new wave band A-ha. It was released on 4 November 1991 by Warner Bros. Records. The album reached number 12 in the UK Albums Chart. It was re-released on 22 September 1998. The new song "Move to Memphis" is featured on this album, and was released as a single in 1991. "Move to Memphis" was later re-recorded for their fifth studio album, Memorial Beach. The DVD of the same name also includes 18 videos.

Critical reception

Upon its release, Paul Lester, writing for Melody Maker, concluded, "If you want the cream of easily the greatest teen group of the last 10 years, buy A-ha's first three albums (their singles are most definitely not their best songs) and make your own compilation." Simon Dudfield of NME described the compilation as "fiscally hoping to make up all the money WEA wasted on trying to relaunch the band as serious artists". He added that "without the videos the song have nothing to recommend themselves", with the exception of "Take on Me" and "The Sun Always Shines on T.V."

Track listing

Singles
"Move to Memphis" (October 14, 1991)
"The Blood That Moves the Body" (The Gun Remix) (March 30, 1992) (Released to promote the album but not featured on the album itself.)

VHS & DVD
 "Introduction" 
 "Take On Me"
 "Cry Wolf" 
 "Touchy" 
 "You Are the One" (Remix)
 "Manhattan Skyline" 
 "The Blood That Moves the Body"
 "There's Never a Forever Thing" 
 "Early Morning" 
 "Hunting High and Low" 
 "I've Been Losing You" (Live at NRK)
 "Crying in the Rain" 
 "I Call Your Name" 
 "Stay on These Roads" 
 "Sycamore Leaves" 
 "Train of Thought" 
 "The Sun Always Shines on T.V."
 "Move to Memphis" (not on VHS)

Charts

Certifications

References

1991 greatest hits albums
1991 video albums
A-ha albums
Music video compilation albums
Warner Records compilation albums
Albums produced by Alan Tarney